Hathor 9 - Coptic Calendar - Hathor 11 

The tenth day of the Coptic month of Hathor, the third month of the Coptic year. On a common year, this day corresponds to November 6, of the Julian Calendar, and November 19, of the Gregorian Calendar. This day falls in the Coptic season of Peret, the season of emergence.

Commemorations

Saints 

 The martyrdom of the Fifty Virgins, and their mother Saint Sophia

Other commemorations 

 The assembly of a Council in Rome because of the Feast of the Theophany, and the Great Lent

References 

Days of the Coptic calendar